Minister Cedric LeVance Ford (born September 28, 1968) is an American gospel musician and leader of Worship Unlimited, currently based out of Houston, Texas because he is the music minister at Reflections of Christ Church. His first album, Featuring Visions: A Choral Ministry, was released by Muscle Shoals Records in 2000, and produced by Dorothy Norwood. He released, Created 2 Worship, with Tyscot Records in 2009, and this was a Billboard magazine breakthrough release upon the Gospel Albums chart at number 34. He was nominated for a NAACP Theatre Award for his role in The Fabric of a Man by David E. Talbert.

Early life
Ford was born on September 28, 1968, in Chicago, Illinois, as Cedric LeVance Ford, whose father is Elder Collin Ford and mother Emma J. Ford.

Music career
His music recording career commenced in 2000, with the release of Featuring Visions: A Choral Ministry by Muscle Shoals Records on February 1, 2000, and it was produced by Dorothy Norwood. The subsequent album, Created 2 Worship, was released on May 5, 2009 by Tyscot Records, and this was his breakthrough released upon the Billboard magazine Gospel Albums chart at No. 34.

Theatre career
Ford was in The Fabric of a Man by David E. Talbert, and he was nominated for a NAACP Theatre Award because of his performance.

Discography

References

External links
 Official website
 Cross Rhythms artist profile
 Malaco Records artist profile

1968 births
Living people
African-American songwriters
African-American Christians
Musicians from Chicago
Musicians from Houston
Songwriters from Illinois
Songwriters from Texas
21st-century African-American people
20th-century African-American people